Little cave eptesicus is a common name of a bat which may refer to:

 Vespadelus pumilus, eastern forest bat 
 Vespadelus caurinus, northern cave bat
 Vespadelus finlaysoni, northern cave bat, Finlayson's cave bat